Julio Moreno (17 January 1903 – 19 May 1963) was a Chilean fencer. He competed in the individual and team sabre and team épée events at the 1936 Summer Olympics.

References

External links
 

1903 births
1963 deaths
Chilean male sabre fencers
Olympic fencers of Chile
Fencers at the 1936 Summer Olympics
Chilean male épée fencers
20th-century Chilean people